These are the results of the women's qualification round, the preliminary round which decided the finalists for all six events for women in artistic gymnastics at the 2004 Summer Olympics in Athens.  The qualification round took place on August 15 at the Olympic Indoor Hall.

The top twelve teams from the 2003 World Artistic Gymnastics Championships completed for places in the team final.  Each team was allowed to bring up to six gymnasts.  During qualification, each team could have up to five gymnasts compete on each apparatus, and could count the four highest scores for the team total.  The eight teams with the highest scores in the qualification round advanced to the team final.

Individual gymnasts, including those who were not part of a team, competed for places in the all-around and apparatus finals.  The twenty-four gymnasts with the highest scores in the all-around advanced to that final, except that each country could only send two gymnasts to the all-around final.  The eight gymnasts with the highest scores on each apparatus advanced to those finals, except that each country could only send two gymnasts to each apparatus final.

In total, 98 gymnasts from 32 countries competed in the qualification round.

Results

Finalists

Team all-around

Individual all-around

**Oana Ban and Monette Russo had to withdraw from the all-around final due to injury, and were replaced with the next qualifying gymnasts, Leyanet González and Stephanie Moorhouse.

Vault

Uneven bars

Balance beam

Floor exercise

References
 Gymnastics Results.com

Women's artistic qualification
2004
2004 in women's gymnastics
Women's events at the 2004 Summer Olympics